HMS Nisus was a Royal Navy 38-gun fifth rate frigate, launched in 1810 at Plymouth, named for Virgil's character Nisus from The Aeneid.

Nisus entered service in 1810 under the command of Captain Philip Beaver, and sailed for the Indian Ocean, where she participated in the squadron led by Admiral Albemarle Bertie which landed troops on Île de France and captured the island from the French in December 1810.

By agreement, Eclipse and Nisus shared in the prize money for the capture of the Renommée on 20 May 1811 at the Battle of Tamatave, and one week later of the Néréide. In August 1811, Nisus supported the Invasion of Java and was involved in a successful attack on the French fortified port of Cheribon, seizing the fort and defeating a French army sent to drive the British off. In September the force captured Surabaya.

In 1814 command passed to Charles Marsh Schomberg and in 1815 she was laid up at Plymouth, prior to being broken up in 1822.

Notes, citations, and references
Notes

Citations

References
 Ships of the Old Navy

Ships built in Plymouth, Devon
Frigates of the Royal Navy
Royal Navy ship names